This is a list of African-American newspapers that have been published in the state of New York. It includes both current and historical newspapers. New York was the birthplace of the African American press, with the publication of Freedom's Journal in 1827, and has remained a vibrant center of publishing ever since.

Newspapers

Upstate 

For the purpose of this list, Upstate New York is the entirety of New York State outside of New York City and Long Island.

Long Island

New York City 

Newspapers are listed by borough where available.

See also 
List of African-American newspapers and media outlets
List of African-American newspapers in Connecticut
List of African-American newspapers in Massachusetts
List of African-American newspapers in New Jersey
List of African-American newspapers in Pennsylvania
List of newspapers in New York

Works cited

References 

Newspapers
New York
African-American
African-American newspapers